Laura J. Rittenhouse (Arter; April 30, 1841 – July 11, 1911) was an American temperance activist, juvenile literature author, poet, businesswoman, and club-woman of the long nineteenth century. She was the author of the poem, "Out of the Depths".

Biography
Laura Jacinta Arter was born in Grand Chain, Pulaski County, Illinois, near the Ohio River, April 30, 1841. She was a daughter of Dr. Daniel Arter. From her parents she inherited her tastes and talent for literature. Her education was received in the schools of the sparsely-settled county, but she supplemented her deficient schooling by self-study and wide reading.

In Pulaski County, December 31, 1863, she married Wood Rittenhouse (1835–1896), a prominent business man of Cairo, Illinois. Their family included one daughter and four sons: Isabella Maud, Wood Arter, Harry H., Fred M. and Robin C. Rittenhouse.

After her marriage, for many years, Rittenhouse was able to spare little time for literary work, but during the early 1890s, she was a frequent contributor to magazines and newspapers. Her best work was done in her short stories. She was a skillful writer of plots, and all her stories were carefully worked out to their logical ending.

For years, her interests were given to the work of the Woman's Christian Temperance Union (WCTU), and for that body, she worked and wrote unceasingly. She was the first president of the WCTU of Cairo, serving in that office for many years. She was elected district president of that organization for four consecutive years, and for five years, she also served as district treasurer. She served as secretary of the Social Science Association in Cairo, secretary of the Centennial Association in Cairo, and secretary of the Cairo Protestant Orphan Asylum, besides acting as manager of the asylum for many years. She served a year as secretary of the Cairo Women's Library Club, president (three years) of the Presbyterian Woman's Aid Society in Cairo, and vice-president of the Red Cross Society in Cairo.

Rittenhouse died on July 11, 1911, in Chicago, Illinois. She was buried at Cairo City Cemetery, in Villa Ridge, Illinois.

Selected works

Poetry
 "Out of the Depths"

Short stories
 Richard Graham's Love, by Laura J. Rittenhouse

References

Attribution

External links
 
 

1841 births
1911 deaths
19th-century American women writers
19th-century American poets
19th-century American short story writers
People from Pulaski County, Illinois
Writers from Illinois
Woman's Christian Temperance Union people
Clubwomen
Wikipedia articles incorporating text from A Woman of the Century